Abdul Kadar Khatri (1961–2019) was an Indian master craftsman in the sector of traditional hand block printing known as Bagh Print. He was the son of Ismail Sulemanji Khatri, founder of Bagh print. He along with his father saved the tradition of Textile printing of Bagh from extinction and taken it to new heights. His artifacts have brought laurels to India and particular to Madhya Pradesh state  from across the globe by showcasing his exceptional talent in Bagh Print in many countries. His family has been working in the trade of Traditional Bagh Hand Block print since the 7th century.

His work was appreciated by Kamaladevi Chattopadhyay, Martand Singh, Laila Tyabji, and Ṛta Kapur Chishti.

Abdul Kadar Khatri experimented incorporating modernity in the wood blocks and colours.

Early life
Abdul Kadar was born on 1 April 1961 to a Muslim family in Bagh, Madhya Pradesh, India. He was son of Ismail Sulemanji Khatri, founder of Bagh Print. Kadar was the eldest of five brothers and one sister in his family. His ancestors, the Khatri community, who comprise the 'chhipas' or printers, were originally from Larkana in Sindh (now in Pakistan), they came here about 400 years ago, and had since migrated to Marwad in Rajasthan and then to Manawar and they finally settled in Bagh. With them they brought the block printing technique. Kadar along with his father improved upon the red and black dyes previously used and developed new vegetable based dyes. His primary innovation was creating the Bagh Print on different types of cloth by printing on them.

Recognitions/honours
 National Award by Former President of India Pratibha Patil from Ministry of Textiles, Government of India at Vigyan Bhawan, New Delhi, India in 2005.
 State Award by former Governor of Madhya Pradesh Kunwar Mahmud Ali Khan in 1991.
 International Award of Excellence for Handicrafts by UNESCO in 2018.
 Kala Nidhi Award by Haryana Tourism at Surajkund International Crafts Festival by Governor of Haryana Kaptan Singh Solanki and Governor of Chhattisgarh Balram Das Tandon in 2015.
 Certificate of Appreciation for Muscat Festival by Indian embassy in Muscat, Oman
 Certificate of Appreciation for International Sourcing Show Melbourne by Consulate General of India in Melbourne, Australia.

References

External links 
 

1961 births
Indian artisans
People from Dhar district
2019 deaths
20th-century printmakers
21st-century printmakers
Indian printmakers